According to Constitution of Myanmar, the Constitutional Tribunal of the Union was founded on 31 March 2011. Its headquarters is located in Office No. 54, Ottarathiri Township, Nay Pyi Taw City, Myanmar. There is one chairperson and eight members on the Tribunal, who serve five year terms. Members of the tribunal are elected proportionally by the President, Pyithu Hluttaw, and Amyotha Hluttaw. The members of the Constitutional Tribunal are all required to be legal experts.

Background
In the 1947 Constitution, the Supreme Court decided upon constitutional disputes and interpreted the constitution (subject to article 151). In the 1974 Constitution, only the Pyithu Hluttaw (House of Representatives) had the power of interpretation (according to article 200 and 201).
The National Convention was held on 16 September 1993. It agreed on 104 basic principles to be included in the formation of new constitution. All representatives in this Convention agreed to the following basic principles concerning with the establishment of a Constitutional Tribunal -
“A Constitutional Tribunal shall be set up to interpret the provisions of the Constitution, to scrutinize whether or not laws enacted by the Pyidaungsu Hluttaw, the Regional Hluttaws, the State Hluttaws and functions of executive authorities of Pyidaungsu, Regions, States and Self-Administered Areas are in conformity with the Constitution. Its function is to decide on disputes relating to the Constitution between Pyidaungsu and Regions, between Pyidaungsu and States, among Regions, among States, and between Regions or States and Self-Administered Areas and among Self-Administered Areas themselves. Its role is to perform other duties prescribed in the Constitution,” as well.
In formulation the 2008 Constitution, the Commission drafted the following provisions regarding  the Constitutional Tribunal -
 the establishment of a Constitutional Tribunal “Chapter(1), Basic Principles of the Union” (article 46);
 the formation of a Tribunal, tenure, duties and functions, effect of decisions, submitting submissions, impeachment, “Chapter (6), Judicial”  (from article 320 to 326);
Hence the 2008 Constitution was enforced in the first meeting of the Pyidaungsu Hluttaw (Union Parliament) which was held on 31 January 2011 and  the first Constitutional Tribunal was established on 30, March 2011.

In the aftermath of the 2021 Myanmar coup d'état, on 8 February, the State Administration Council reshuffled the Constitutional Tribunal membership, appointing nine new members, including Than Kyaw as its chair.

Chairperson and Members (Justices)
 Mr. Myo Nyunt (Chairperson)
 Mr. Tin Maung Myint
 Mr. Myint Win
 Mr. Myo Myint
 Mr. Khin Maung Cho
 Ms. Khin Htay Kywae
 Mr. Tual Cin Pau
 Mrs.Hla Myo Nwe
 Mr. Kyaw San

List of chairpersons
Thein Soe (30 March 2011 to 6 September 2012)
Mya Thein (26 February 2013 to 29 March 2016)
Myo Nyunt (30 March 2016 to date)

References

External links
 Official website

Judiciary of Myanmar
Constitutional courts
2011 establishments in Myanmar
Courts and tribunals established in 2011